Alfonso Bruno (born 1933) is a Venezuelan sprinter. He competed in the men's 4 × 100 metres relay at the 1956 Summer Olympics.

References

1933 births
Living people
Athletes (track and field) at the 1956 Summer Olympics
Venezuelan male sprinters
Olympic athletes of Venezuela
Place of birth missing (living people)